Skripilovo is a rural locality (a village) in Kubenskoye Rural Settlement, Vologodsky District, Vologda Oblast, Russia. The population was 12 as of 2002.

Geography 
Skripilovo is located 43 km southwest of Vologda (the district's administrative centre) by road. Dor is the nearest rural locality.

References 

Rural localities in Vologodsky District